Xavien "Zay" Kevonn Flowers (born September 11, 2000) is an American football wide receiver for the Boston College Eagles.

Early life and high school
Flowers grew up in Fort Lauderdale, Florida, and attended NSU University School. As a junior, he caught 48 passes for 631 yards and 10 touchdowns.

College career
As a true freshman, Flowers caught 22 passes for 341 yards and three touchdowns. After Boston College sent home their students in March 2020, he returned to Florida and worked out on occasion with NFL players Antonio Brown and Geno Smith. Flowers became the second wide receiver in school history to be named first team All-Atlantic Coast Conference after finishing his sophomore season with 56 receptions for 892 yards and nine touchdowns. He was named third-team All-ACC after catching 44 passes for 746 yards and five touchdowns. On December 1, 2022, Flowers declared for the 2023 NFL Draft.

References

External links

Boston College Eagles bio

American football wide receivers
Boston College Eagles football players
Players of American football from Florida
Living people
2000 births